Young Building is a historic office building located at Charlottesville, Virginia. It was built in 1916, and is a two-story, five-bay, single pile brick building in the Jacobean Revival style. It has a large rear wing. The main block has a medium-pitched gabled roof with deeply projecting eaves and decoratively shaped rafter ends. It was built to house the offices for the J. S. Young and Company sumac mill across the street.  The building was adapted for residential use after 1939.

It was listed on the National Register of Historic Places in 1982.

References

Commercial buildings on the National Register of Historic Places in Virginia
Tudor Revival architecture in Virginia
Commercial buildings completed in 1916
Buildings and structures in Charlottesville, Virginia
National Register of Historic Places in Charlottesville, Virginia